Apex Legends is a free-to-play battle royale-hero shooter game developed by Respawn Entertainment and published by Electronic Arts. It was released for PlayStation 4, Windows, and Xbox One in February 2019, for Nintendo Switch in March 2021, and for PlayStation 5 and Xbox Series X/S in March 2022. A mobile version of the game designed for touchscreens titled Apex Legends Mobile was released in May 2022 on Android and iOS. The game supports cross-platform play, excluding the aforementioned mobile platforms.

Before the match, players form into two- or three-player squads, and select from pre-designed characters with distinctive abilities, known as "Legends". The game has two gameplay modes. In "Battle Royale", up to 20 three-person squads or 30 two-person duos land on an island and search for weapons and supplies before attempting to defeat all other players in combat. The available play area on the island shrinks over time, forcing players to keep moving or else find themselves outside the play area which can be fatal. The final team alive wins the round. In "Arenas", players form into three-player squads and fight against another squad in a 3v3 team deathmatch over a series of rounds to determine the winner of the match. Teams win when their team has at least 3 points and is 2 points ahead.

Apex Legends is set in the same science fiction universe as Respawn Entertainment's Titanfall series, with several characters from the Titanfall series appearing either as minor characters or playable Legends. Work on the game began around late 2016, though the project remained a secret right up until its launch. The game's release in 2019 came as a surprise, as until that point it had been assumed that Respawn Entertainment was working on a third installment to the Titanfall franchise, the studio's previous major game. Apex Legends received generally positive reviews from critics, who praised its gameplay, progression system, and fusion of elements from various genres. Some considered it a worthy competitor to other battle royale games. Apex Legends surpassed 25 million players by the end of its first week, and 50 million within its first month. By April 2021, it had approximately 100 million players making it one of the most played video games of all time by player count.

Gameplay 

Apex Legends is an online multiplayer battle royale game featuring squads of three players using pre-made characters with distinctive abilities, called "Legends", similar to those of hero shooters. Alternate modes have been introduced allowing for single and for two-player squads since the game's release. The game is free-to-play and monetized through microtransactions and loot boxes, which allow the player to spend both real money and in-game currency on cosmetic items, such as outfits for the Legends and new colors for weapons.

Each match generally features twenty teams of three-player squads. Players can join friends in a squad or can be matched randomly with other players. Before the match, each player on the squad selects one of the 23 playable characters (as of season 15), with the exception that no character may be selected more than once by a squad. Each character in the squad has a unique design, personality, and abilities that provide different playstyles to the team. All teams are then placed on an aircraft that passes over the game map. One player in each squad is the jumpmaster, selecting when the squad should skydive out of the aircraft and where to land with the concurrence of the other squad members. However, players are free to deviate from the squad's path.

Once on the ground, the squad can scavenge for weapons, armor, and other equipment that is scattered around buildings, or in crates randomly distributed around the map, while keeping an eye out for other squads. Apex Legends includes a nonverbal communication "ping system" which allows players to use their game controller to communicate to their squad certain directions, weapon locations, enemies, and suggested strategies. While the game offers movement options similar to other shooters, it includes some of the gameplay features of previous Titanfall games, such as the ability to climb over short walls, slide down inclined surfaces, and use zip-lines to traverse an area quickly.

Over time, the game's safe zone will reduce in size around a randomly-selected point on the map; players outside the safe zone take damage and may die if they do not reach the safe zone in time. This also confines squads to smaller spaces to force encounters. The last squad with any members left alive is crowned the "Apex Champions" of that match. Players who become knocked down in the course of a game can be revived by their squadmates. Should a player be killed completely, they can still be resurrected if their team member(s) collect their respawn banner, which appears at the place where they died, and bring it to one of several beacons on the island. The banner, however, must be collected within a time limit, before expiring and fully eliminating the player.

Season 9 introduced a new permanent mode named "Arena". In this mode, players form into three-player squads and fight against another squad in a 3v3 team deathmatch over a series of rounds to determine the winner of the match. Teams win when their team has at least 3 points and is 2 points ahead. Additionally, if a game should drag on to round 9 (where both teams have 4 points) a final sudden death round begins. Respawn stated this scoring system "prevents total blowout games from dragging on for too long" and also "lets more competitive games keep the heat going for longer". Rather than skydiving onto the map and gathering equipment like in the battle royale mode, players spawn in a "shop" where they can purchase equipment and charges of their Legend's abilities using materials earned in the previous rounds to prepare for the next fight. This variation of the game borrows mechanics from other shooters such as Counter Strike and Valorant. The mode is the first permanent deviation away from the battle royale format. It would later be removed in Season 16.

Seasons
Each new season is intended to bring with it the release of a new playable character, usually new weapons and purchasable cosmetic items.

The game's first season started on March 19, 2019. Associated with seasons are time-limited battle passes that reward players with new cosmetic items, should they complete in-game challenges during the season. Alongside new cosmetic items, seasons can also bring changes to the map and additional gameplay elements.

Maps

There are different maps available for Battle Royal mode, and for Arenas mode. 
Each season has only a selection of these available maps on rotation (usually 3 for Battle Royal, and 5 for Arenas).

Battle Royale
 Broken Moon
 Kings Canyon
 World's Edge 
 Olympus
 Storm Point

Arenas
 Drop Off
 Habitat 4
 Encore 
 Overflow
 Party Crasher
 Phase Runner

Events
In addition to the season contents, Apex Legends features limited-time events.
These events offer unique, limited-time cosmetics themed to the event (for example, in the case of the Holo-Day Bash, Christmas-themed outfits) that can be earned in-game. Events also provide unique limited-time game modes (such as shotguns and snipers only). Some events also introduced changes to the current season map with a new point of interest (known as a "Town Takeover"), which is themed around one of the legends.

In addition to these major events, there are occasional minor events which only introduce cosmetics available to purchase (such as "Summer of Plunder" and "Arena Flash Events" which ran from season 9 through 10 and had 6 events occur.), or limited-time game modes (without limited-time collectible items), such as the Battle Armor mode (April 28, 2020 to May 12, 2020).

Characters 
Apex Legends has a diverse cast of 23 characters, divided into 5 classes (5 for Assault, 6 for Skimirsher, 4 for Recon, 4 for Support and 4 for Controller). Many of the character designs are based on Titanfall.

Mobile Exclusive Characters
Aside of the cast of characters in the main game, there were two exclusive characters that were only playable in Apex Legends Mobile.

Development 
Developer Respawn Entertainment had previously developed Titanfall (2014) and its sequel Titanfall 2 (2016), both of which were published by Electronic Arts (EA) who eventually acquired Respawn Entertainment in 2017.

According to design director Mackey McCandlish, initial design on Apex Legends started before Titanfall 2 had shipped in 2016 and as of 2018 the entire Titanfall team at Respawn Entertainment was working on the project; however, executive producer Drew McCoy stated that work on the game did not begin until the spring of 2017. He also confirmed that the game had approximately 115 developers working on it, making it the studio's most labor-intensive project. Titanfall 2, by way of comparison, had around 85 developers.

According to McCoy, the studio was not sure what their next game would be after completing the post-release support for Titanfall 2, though they knew they wanted to keep making Titanfall games. As with the development of Titanfall 2, the studio broke into several small teams to create "action blocks", small game prototypes that showcase a gameplay element, a weapon, or similar feature of a game that would fit into a Titanfall sequel. One such "action block" was inspired by the success of the battle royale game genre led by PlayerUnknown's Battlegrounds; this prototype, which applied gameplay mechanics of previous Titanfall games in a battle royale format, was considered very successful and the studio decided to expand this model. The designers decided that having the pilotable Titans (large mecha) from their previous games would not work well in a battle-royale setting and instead focused on creating strong character classes which felt appropriate for the Titanfall franchise. They also found that some maneuverability features of prior Titanfall titles, such as wall-running, would make gameplay too challenging in a battle royale format, as identifying the direction of threats would be too difficult.

Respawn Entertainment CEO Vince Zampella told VentureBeat that Apex Legends, as a live-service and free-to-play battle-royale game, was a new challenge for the studio and represented a new way for them of developing games. Their design philosophy was focused on "chasing the fun" and designing all the mechanics around team-based play, rather than solo play. The final decision on major design factors, such as the size of the teams, the number of teams and the size of the map, were all based on what felt "most fun" to the developers and were strongly guided by "gut feeling".

Design director Mackey McCandlish also stated that with Apex Legends, they were looking to challenge the conventions of the still relatively young battle-royale genre and to add their studio's unique touch to that class of games. They felt that the choice of three-man squads and a limit of 20 teams gave players on average a greater chance to win and also felt more in line with the type of intimate gameplay they were hoping to achieve. McCandlish claimed that the studio felt the need to create a "defensible space" in the battle-royale mode which could not be easily imitated and that the communication system, the three-man squads, and the smaller playing area were all aligned with this goal.

As part of the development process, the game underwent extensive play-testing to ensure that all elements felt fun and balanced. Collectively the developers spent 100 to 200 hours a day trying out the game, a process which executive producer Drew McCoy called "probably the most important part of development". To refine the game's non-verbal communication system, the studio play-tested the game for a month without the use of voice chat and applied fake names to the play-testers to predict how most players would experience the game.

With the game mostly completed, Respawn's director of brand marketing, Arturo Castro, began working on how the studio would name and market it. Castro recognized that the game featured many elements which players would expect from a Titanfall franchise game, but lacked core elements such as Titans, Pilots and a single-player experience. Additionally, it had already been reported that Respawn was working on Titanfall 3 from a source at the studio. Respawn therefore decided that attempting to market the game as part of the Titanfall series would have been difficult and would risk alienating Titanfall fans. They, therefore, opted to treat the game as a new intellectual property (IP). Respawn were also concerned that as they at that time had recently been acquired by EA, players would think that EA had forced them to make a battle royale game. McCoy affirmed that they had to convince Electronic Arts to allow them to make this game: "we decided to make this game. Not to be throwing EA under the bus, but this wasn't the game they were expecting. I had to go to executives, show it to them, and explain it and...not convince but more, 'Hey, trust us! This is the thing you want out of us.' [...] This is a game where we had to say, 'This is what we want to do. Help us get there.'"

Concerned that a standard six-month marketing campaign for the game would have generated negative publicity from disgruntled Titanfall fans, Castro claims they eventually took inspiration from musical artist Beyoncé whose release of her self-titled album came as a surprise to fans—a strategy which proved financially successful. Wanting to generate some buzz about this new product before its release, the studio secretly arranged for about 100 social media influencers to travel to their studio to try the game and then instructed them to "tease" news of it on their social media accounts during halftime of the Super Bowl LIII, the day before Apex Legends formal release. Respawn CEO Vince Zampella felt the approach was "gross", according to Castro, as he found it reminiscent of the infamous Fyre Festival "hype" which later turned out to be a fraudulent event. However, as Apex Legends was already ready for release at this point, Castro felt the approach was an appropriate marketing strategy. Because of the game's performance in terms of player-count and viewership on streaming services, Castro felt vindicated in this decision. This approach was uncharacteristic of any prior EA title.

The game is built using a modified version of Source engine; Source had previously been used for Titanfall 2, however for Apex Legends several necessary adjustments to allow for the increased draw distances and the large game map were made. Apex Legends is believed to be pushing at the technological limits of its game engine and as a result, the game compromises on dynamic display resolution, with the quality of the image and frame rate suffering particularly on console versions and on lower-end PC devices.

Prior to launch, McCoy confirmed there were plans to implement cross-platform play to the game in the future, though claimed that game progression and in-game purchases cannot be transferred across systems due to hardware limitations. McCoy has also expressed the desire to eventually bring Apex Legends to iOS, Android, and Nintendo Switch.

According to anonymous reports, Tencent Games is working with Electronic Arts to bring Apex Legends to China, as partnering with a local Chinese firm is a requirement for Western media companies wishing to make their products legally available in the country. In January 2020, EA confirmed to investors that it was working with a local partner in order to bring the game to PC in China, though it did not mention the partner by name.

Respawn established a new Vancouver, British Columbia, studio, within the EA Vancouver campus, dedicated to supporting Apex Legends in May 2020.

As part of the June 2020 EA Play presentation, Respawn announced that Apex Legends would be brought to the Steam storefront for Windows players, as well as to the Nintendo Switch by late 2020. Further, the game would support cross-platform play across all supported platforms on these releases. Cross-platform play was introduced into the game with the Aftermarket Collection Event. In a blog post by Respawn in late October 2020, it was revealed that the Steam version will launch on November 4, the same day as the launch of season 7. However, the Nintendo Switch version was delayed to March 9, 2021. The Nintendo Switch version of Apex Legends was developed by Panic Button, known for their Switch ports of the DOOM series and Rocket League.

Electronic Arts also confirmed that mobile launches on iOS and Android were in development in collaboration with a Chinese mobile company. The mobile ports are set to release by the end of 2022. In April 2021, Electronic Arts announced that the mobile version of the game would be titled Apex Legends Mobile, and would begin beta testing in the coming months. In July 2021, Apex Legends was hacked by individuals wishing to draw attention to persistent problems with cheating in the Titanfall series that had been unaddressed by Electronic Arts and Respawn. Large banners pointed players of Apex Legends to a website outlining their concerns.

In February 2022, Respawn announced that a native version of Apex Legends for PlayStation 5 and Xbox Series X/S was "coming very soon..." and that it would introduce new features specifically for the next generation consoles. These versions were released on March 29, 2022.

Apex Legends Mobile is set to release on May 17, 2022, for iOS and Android devices. The game is published by Electronic Arts and developed by Chinese company Lightspeed and Quantum Studios, a subsidiary of Tencent and the developer of PUBG Mobile. The game will be shut down on May 1, 2023.

Esports
Shortly after Apex Legends launch, it was seen as a potential esport competition, and Respawn had anticipated establishing events once the game had been established. As early as March 2019, various esport team sponsors began to assemble Apex Legends teams for these competitions. ESPN launched its EXP program to showcase esports events running alongside other ESPN-managed sporting events. The first such event was the EXP Pro-Am Apex Legends Exhibition, run on July 11, 2019, alongside the 2019 ESPY Awards. An EXP Invitational event with a $150,000 prize pool took place alongside the X Games Minneapolis 2019 from August 1 to 4, 2019. However, as a result of the El Paso and Dayton mass shootings that occurred over that weekend, both ESPN and ABC opted to delay broadcast of the event out of respect for the victims of the shootings.

Respawn and EA announced the Apex Legends Global Series in December 2019, consisting of several online events and twelve live events during 2020 with a total  prize pool. The Global Series follows a similar approach as Fortnite Battle Royale by using multiple tiers of events to qualify players. Players will qualify for the Global Series through Online Tournaments. Top players and teams from these events will be invited to either regional Challenger events or to global Premier events, where the winners have a chance for a cash payout and invitations to one of the three major events. Three Major events will be held for one hundred teams to accumulate points in the Global Series to vie for placement in the final Major event as well as part of a  prize pool. The fourth Major event had up to sixty teams competing for a portion of a  pool.

Year 2 of the ALGS began in September 2021.

Year 3 of the ALGS began on July 7, 2022, consisting of 40 teams around the world with a total US$2 million prize pool. The first place belongs to Darkzero Esports, with the prize of US$500,000.

Reception

Apex Legends received "generally favorable" reviews for most platforms according to review aggregator Metacritic; the Nintendo Switch version received "mixed or average" reviews. Some publications, including Destructoid, Game Informer, GamesRadar+, and PC Gamer, called it one of the best takes on the battle royale genre thus far, and a worthy challenger to Fortnite Battle Royale dominance of the genre.

Critics lauded the combat in Apex Legends. Destructoid referred to the gunplay as the best they had experienced in a battle royale thus far; however, they felt let down that some of the mechanics from the previous Titanfall games were not present. Javy Gwaltney of Game Informer, on the other hand, claimed that the omission of the Titans and other elements from previous Respawn games was not a problem and found the combat to be satisfying and the gunplay powerful. He added that the addition of heroes can make for more exciting combat than in other battle royale games.

Reviewers praised the non-verbal communication system in the game (known as the "ping system") with most considering it to be highly innovative. Polygon's Khee Hoon Chan opined that it "rendered voice chat with strangers largely unnecessary", and was emblematic of Apex Legends accessibility and astuteness. Destructoid likewise enjoyed the mechanic, predicting that it would become the new norm for the video games industry in battle royale games. Rock Paper Shotgun called it the "gold standard for non-verbal communication in games" and noted that, while not an entirely new concept, Respawn Entertainment had refined the idea. While Electronic Arts had received a U.S. patent for the ping system in 2021, the company announced that the ping system patent and four others related to game accessibility would be made available for free to game developers to use without fear of litigation starting in August 2021. IGN awarded the game a 9, summing up the review by saying "Apex Legends is squad-based battle royale done right, complete with cool heroes, a superb communication system, and polished mechanics"

Apex Legends received critical praise for the perceived diversity of its playable characters. Several characters are LGBTQ, including one non-binary character, though some reviewers felt that the nature of the game did not allow for a narrative which properly highlights this diversity.

Awards

Player-count and revenue 
Eight hours after its launch, Apex Legends surpassed one million unique players, and reached 2.5 million unique players within 24 hours. In one week it achieved a total of 25 million players, with over 2 million peak concurrent, and by the end of its first month it reached 50 million players in total.

Within the first month of its release, Apex Legends made $92 million in revenue across all platforms, the highest amount earned by any free-to-play game during its month of launch.

As news and popularity of Apex Legends spread, analysts saw the game as something to challenge the dominance of Fortnite Battle Royale, and by February 8, 2019—four days after the game's release—EA had seen its largest growth in stock value since 2014 on the basis of Apex Legends sudden success.

Throughout April, the game was estimated to have earned $24 million in revenue, representing 74 percent less than the amount it earned during its first month, as the game failed to sustain the same level of interest generated by its launch.

In July 2019, EA told investors that the game had 8 to 10 million players a week and also credited Apex Legends with the company's recent upturn in live services earnings as their Q1 2020 financial results exceeded expectations.

With the release of season 3 in October 2019, Apex Legends reached a playerbase of 70 million people internationally and is believed to have earned $45 million in that month alone.

In February 2021, EA's CFO, Blake Jorgensen, confirmed that Apex Legends has surpassed $1 billion in revenue.

In April 2021, right before the release of the game's 9th season, Respawn announced that Apex Legends had reached a playerbase of over 100 million people and was expected to pull in $500 million that year.

On August 11, 2022, the game broke its all-time record for number of consecutive players on Steam with 510,286, according to stat-tracking database Steamcharts.

Controversies 
With the introduction of the 'Iron Crown' limited-time event in August 2019, the developers released several purchasable in-game cosmetic items. The vast majority of these items could only be acquired through purchasing loot boxes, and the most sought-after item (a cosmetic axe for one of the player characters) could only be purchased at an additional cost after first having obtained 24 other purchasable items. Players and media outlets decried that as a result of this transaction model, the cost of the most sought-after item was approximately $170 (or £130)—a price point which Forbes called "hilariously out of touch" and compared negatively to most other major microtransaction models in the industry.

This resulted in a negative backlash from the player community and industry journalists, particularly on Reddit, where members of the Apex Legends community forum traded insults with developers of the game with the increasingly strong language being used by both parties.

As a result, Respawn Entertainment apologized for what they agreed was unfair monetization and promised to allow players the chance to purchase cosmetic items directly (rather than rely on loot boxes), albeit at an increased price. Respawn Entertainment CEO Vince Zampella later apologized for members of the development team "crossing a line with their comments", while also defending that they stood up for themselves against alleged death threats and insults aimed at their family members.

Around July 4, 2021, unknown agents appeared to have broken EA and Respawn's server security as to change in-game messages to point to a website that purportedly was trying to "Save Titanfall". The site and messages spoke of the weak security that both Titanfall and Titanfall 2 servers had, leading to the games becoming unplayable due to the number of other hackers using denial of service attacks to bring down the servers. A community-led investigation determined that the owners of the website were directly involved in hacking the Apex servers were also behind some of the denial attacks on the Titanfall servers as a type of false flag to get Respawn to bring back the cancelled Titanfall Online game.

The 'Monsters Within' event released on October 12, 2021, as the 2021 Halloween Event. People were upset when it was announced because the event was not launching with the Shadow Royale gamemode, and it was instead only going to be available for the final week of the event. There was also controversy over the way that Respawn sold the event skins, as players could not buy them by themselves. People were also upset because the game was in a state of constant crashes and many game breaking bugs.

Notes

References

External links 
 

2010s fads and trends
2019 video games
Battle royale games
British Academy Games Award for Multiplayer winners
Fiction about corporate warfare
Electronic Arts games
Esports games
First-person shooter multiplayer online games
First-person shooters
Free-to-play video games
Golden Joystick Award winners
Hero shooters
Nintendo Switch games
PlayStation 4 games
PlayStation 4 Pro enhanced games
PlayStation 5 games
Respawn Entertainment games
Source (game engine) games
Titanfall
Video games adapted into comics
Video games containing battle passes
Video games containing loot boxes
Video games scored by Stephen Barton
Video games set on fictional planets
Windows games
Xbox One games
Xbox One X enhanced games
Xbox Series X and Series S games
 
D.I.C.E. Award for Online Game of the Year winners
Video games developed in the United States